NELP may refer to:
 New England Literature Program, an academic program run by the University of Michigan
 New Exploration Licensing Policy, the current oil exploration policy in India
 North East London Polytechnic, currently the University of East London (UEL), in the United Kingdom